Hugh Peter Martin Donnelly (born 26 March 1964) is a motor racing driver from Belfast, Northern Ireland. He competed in Formula Three and Formula 3000 where he won 3 races. In the 1988 International Formula 3000 season he placed third despite only competing in the final five rounds of the championship. After leaving F1, he has been a prominent driving coach and retains an association with Lotus Cars.

Racing career

Formula One
During , as well as his racing commitments, Donnelly was the test driver for Lotus Formula One team. But it was during  that Donnelly got his first race start when he substituted for Arrows driver Derek Warwick at the 1989 French Grand Prix after Warwick injured his back in a non-competitive karting accident. He impressed in France qualifying 14th compared to his much more experienced teammate Eddie Cheever who started 25th on the grid. Donnelly finished his first F1 race 3 laps down in 12th place and was the last car running to finish while Cheever's experience told and he had a better race finishing only 1 lap down in 7th place.

In  he continued in F1 with Lotus though this time not as a test driver but as a race driver alongside new teammate Derek Warwick. However, it was a frustrating season of scoring no points driving the V12 powered Lotus-Lamborghini which often saw him retire with engine failure. Donnelly's performance in the Lotus drew interest from several more competitive teams, prompting Lotus to renegotiate his contract for 5.6 million pounds, to prevent him from being bought out. Shortly thereafter he suffered a serious crash caused by suspension failure during practice at the Jerez circuit which ended his Formula One racing career. He sustained multiple injuries in the crash, including brain and lung contusions as well as severe leg fractures, the latter of which almost necessitated the amputation of his right leg. The leg injuries made Donnelly unable to drive single-seater racing cars.

After Formula One
Donnelly has since raced in smaller club events, and owned a Formula Vauxhall and Formula Three team, Martin Donnelly Racing. In 2004, Donnelly raced a Mazda RX-8 in a Silverstone 24-Hour race, finishing in 27th place. 2006 saw Donnelly return to Lotus, participating in a track day sponsored by a Lotus owner's club. In September 2007, Donnelly beat 35 other Lotus Elises to win Class A in the Donington Park round of the Elise Trophy.  This class win was closely followed by the race win in the 2nd Elise Trophy race of the day.  Later in the season he raced at Spa-Francorchamps and in 2008, campaigned in a Lotus 2-Eleven. Donnelly continues to have a close relationship with Elise Trophy organisers LoTRDC, racing in a Lotus Evora in 2012 and he is currently working as a club steward for Lotus Cup Europe. In 2017 Donnelly raced in the FIA Lotus Cup Europe in a Motul sponsored Lotus Elise.

Donnelly worked as a driver development director for Comtec Racing in 2008. By 2009, Donnelly was no longer associated with Comtec Racing. In June 2010, Donnelly drove as a guest in the Ginetta G50 Cup at Oulton Park. On 2 July 2011 at the Goodwood Festival of Speed, Donnelly drove a Lotus 102 similar to that which nearly took his life. The Lamborghini-powered car was the same specification as the car he drove in 1990, the original car having been completely destroyed in the crash. He has been appointed as the driver representative on the FIA stewards panel for a number of F1 Grand Prix including most recently the 2012 and 2013 Canadian Grand Prix. 

Having worked as sporting director and driver development manager at Comtec Racing, Donnelly has recently formed the Donnelly track academy specialising in Lotus trackday events and racing services in Norfolk.

Donnelly made his British Touring Car Championship début in 2015, briefly driving for the works Infiniti-Support Our Paras Racing team, but the team's plans were thrown into disarray by the marque's subsequent withdrawal of its backing from the project, and he was replaced by Max Coates.

In 2019 Donnelly crashed his moped while participating in a charity rally, rebreaking his femur and subsequently suffering from sepsis. As he was unable to work due to his injuries, a successful fundraiser was held, drawing donations from numerous members of the racing community.

Racing record

Career summary

Complete International Formula 3000 results
(key) (Races in bold indicate pole position; races in italics indicate fastest lap)

Complete Japanese Formula 3000 results
(key)

Complete Formula One results
(key)

Complete British Touring Car Championship results
(key) (Races in bold indicate pole position – 1 point awarded in first race; races in italics indicate fastest lap – 1 point awarded all races; * signifies that driver lead race for at least one lap – 1 point awarded all races)

References

External links

Martin Donnelly biography

1964 births
Living people
Formula One drivers from Northern Ireland
Arrows Formula One drivers
Team Lotus Formula One drivers
Racing drivers from Northern Ireland
British Formula Three Championship drivers
Sportspeople from Belfast
International Formula 3000 drivers
24 Hours of Le Mans drivers
World Sportscar Championship drivers
British Touring Car Championship drivers
Britcar 24-hour drivers
Ginetta GT4 Supercup drivers
Nismo drivers